Nanyeni is a village in Western Province, Kakamega county, Kenya, located in the west of Matungu district.

References

Kakamega County